Philadelphia Freeway 2 is the third studio album from rapper Freeway.
Finally Free is the first single from the album.

Background
Philadelphia Freeway 2 was thought to be released on Roc-A-Fella, but was released on Real Talk Ent. Freeway was no longer an artist on Roc-A-Fella Records.

Sales
Philadelphia Freeway 2 debuted at number 99 on the U.S. Billboard 200 chart, selling about 5,300 units during its first week.

Track listing

Samples
 It's A Good Day
It Was a Good Day by Ice Cube
The Nation
Dialogue from Menace 2 Society

Release history
   May 5, 2009
   May 19, 2009
   June 2, 2009

Charts

References

External links

2009 albums
Albums produced by Cozmo
Freeway (rapper) albums
Real Talk Entertainment albums
Albums produced by Big Hollis
Sequel albums

fr:Free At Last (Freeway album)